The Corriere della Sera is an Italian daily newspaper published in Milan with an average daily circulation of 410,242 copies in December 2015.

First published on 5 March 1876, Corriere della Sera is one of Italy's oldest newspapers and is Italy's most read newspaper. Its masthead has remained unchanged since its first edition in 1876. It reached a circulation of over 1 million under editor and co-owner Luigi Albertini, between 1900 and 1925. He was a strong opponent of socialism, of clericalism, and of Prime Minister Giovanni Giolitti who was willing to compromise with those forces. Albertini's opposition to the Fascist regime forced the other co-owners to oust him in 1925.

Today its main competitors are Rome's la Repubblica and Turin's La Stampa. Corriere della Sera  has always being generally considered centre right leaning, hosting in its columns liberal and democratic cattolicism views.

History and profile
Corriere della Sera was first published on Sunday 5 March 1876 by Eugenio Torelli Viollier. In 1899 the paper began to offer a weekly illustrated supplement, La Domenica del Corriere ("Sunday of the Courier").

In the 1910s and 1920s, under the direction of Luigi Albertini, Corriere della Sera became the most widely read newspaper in Italy, maintaining its importance and influence into the present century. It was Corriere della Sera which introduced comics in Italy in 1908 through a supplement for children, namely Corriere dei Piccoli.

The newspaper's headquarters has been in the same buildings since the beginning of the 20th century, and therefore it is popularly known as "the Via Solferino newspaper" after the street where it is still located. As the name indicates, it was originally an evening paper.

During the fascist regime in Italy Corriere della Sera funded the Mussolini Prize which was awarded to the writers Ada Negri and Emilio Cecchi among the others.

Mario Borsa, a militant anti-fascist, was appointed the editor-in-chief of Corriere della Sera in May 1945. He was fired because of his political leanings in August 1946 and was replaced by Guglielmo Emanuel, a right-wing journalist. Emanuel served in the post until 1952.

In the 1950s Corriere della Sera was the organ of the conservative establishment in Italy and was strongly anti-communist and pro-NATO. The paper was functional in shaping the views of the Italian upper and middle classes during this period.

The owners of the Corriere della Sera, the Crespi family, sold a share to RCS Media in the 1960s and was listed in the Italian stock exchange. Its main shareholders were Mediobanca, the Fiat group and some of the biggest industrial and financial groups in Italy. In 1974 the RCS Media moved on to control the majority of the paper.

Alberto Cavallari was the editor-in-chief of the paper during the early 1980s. In 1981 the newspaper was laterally involved in the P2 scandal when it was discovered that the secret Freemason lodge had the newspaper's editor Franco Di Bella and the former owner Angelo Rizzoli on its member lists. In September 1987 the paper launched a weekly magazine supplement, Sette, which is the first in its category in Italy. From 1987 to 1992 the editor-in-chief of Corriere della Sera was Ugo Stille.

The 1988 circulation of Corriere della Sera was 715,000 copies, making it the second most read newspaper in Italy. The paper started its Saturday supplement, IO Donna, in 1996. In 1997 Corriere della Sera was the best-selling Italian newspaper with a circulation of 687,000 copies.

Corriere della Sera had a circulation of 715,000 copies in 2001. In 2002 it fell to 681,000 copies. In 2003, its then editor Ferruccio de Bortoli resigned from the post. The journalists and opposition politicians claimed the resignation was due to the paper's criticism of Silvio Berlusconi.

In 2004, Corriere della Sera launched an online English section focusing on Italian current affairs and culture. The same year it was the best-selling newspaper in Italy with a circulation of 677,542 copies. Its circulation in December 2007 was 662,253 copies.

It is one of the most visited Italian-language news websites, attracting over 2,4 million readers every day. The online version of the paper was the thirteenth most visited website in the country.

On 24 September 2014 Corriere della Sera changed its broadsheet format to the Berliner format.

On 7 March 2020, during the coronavirus pandemic, Corriere della Sera leaked a draft decree to put into lockdown several northern provinces particularly affected by the virus. The leaked news sparked a panic exodus to the south, and the threat of further contagion led to a nationwide lockdown.

Content and sections
The "Third Page" (a one page-survey dedicated to culture) used to feature a main article named Elzeviro (named after the font originally used), which over the years has published contributions from all the editors as well as major novelists, poets and journalists. On Monday, Corriere is published along with "L'Economia", a weekly finance and business magazine. On Thursday, it is published with "Sette", a current events magazine. On Sunday, it is published along with "la Lettura", a weekly literary supplement.

Contributors past and present
The Italian novelist Dino Buzzati was a journalist at the Corriere della Sera. Other notable contributors include Adolfo Battaglia, Eugenio Montale, Curzio Malaparte, Gabriele D'Annunzio, Enzo Bettiza, Italo Calvino, Alberto Moravia, Amos Oz, Pier Paolo Pasolini, Guido Piovene, Giovanni Spadolini, Oriana Fallaci, Alessandra Farkas, Lando Ferretti, Brunella Gasperini, Enzo Biagi, Indro Montanelli, Giovanni Sartori, Paolo Brera, Francesco Alberoni, Tracy Chevalier, Goffredo Parise, Sergio Romano, Sandro Paternostro, Arturo Quintavalle, Roberto Gervaso, Alan Friedman, Tommaso Landolfi, Alberto Ronchey, Maria Grazia Cutuli, Camilla Cederna, Marida Lombardo Pijola and Paolo Mieli. 
Editors

Luciano Fontana (Editor-in-chief)
Barbara Stefanelli (Vice Editor-in-chief)
Massimo Gramellini (Deputy Editor "ad personam")
Federico Fubini (Deputy Editor "ad personam")
Daniele Manca (Deputy Editor)
Venanzio Postiglione (Deputy Editor)
Giampaolo Tucci (Deputy Editor)

Columnist and journalists

Alberto Alesina (Columnist)
Pierluigi Battista (Journalist)
Giovanni Bianconi (Journalist)
Francesca Bonazzoli (journalist)
Isabella Bossi Fedrigotti (journalist)
Ian Bremmer (Columnist)
Goffredo Buccini (Journalist)
Sabino Cassese (Columnist)
Aldo Cazzullo (Journalist)
Lorenzo Cremonesi (Journalist)
Ferruccio de Bortoli (Columnist, former Editor-in-chief)
Dario Di Vico (Journalist)
Michele Farina (journalist)
Luigi Ferrarella (Journalist)
Antonio Ferrari (Journalist)
Massimo Franco (Journalist)
Davide Frattini (Jerusalem correspondent)
Milena Gabanelli (Journalist)
Massimo Gaggi (New York correspondent)
Ernesto Galli della Loggia (Columnist)
Mario Gerevini (Journalist)
Francesco Giavazzi (Columnist)
Aldo Grasso (Columnist)
Marco Imarisio (Journalist)
Luigi Ippolito (London correspondent)
Paolo Lepri (Journalist)
Claudio Magris (Columnist)
Dacia Maraini (Columnist)
Viviana Mazza (Journalist)
Paolo Mereghetti (Columnist)
Paolo Mieli (Columnist, former Editor-in-chief)
Stefano Montefiori (Paris correspondent)
Guido Olimpio (Journalist)
Angelo Panebianco (Columnist)
Mario Pappagallo (Columnist)
Magda Poli (journalist)
Antonio Polito (Columnist)
Maurizio Porro (journalist)
Sergio Romano (Columnist)
Arianna Ravelli (journalist)
Nicola Saldutti (Journalist)
Guido Santevecchi (Beijing correspondent)
Giuseppe Sarcina (Washington correspondent)
Fiorenza Sarzanini (Journalist)
Beppe Severgnini (Journalist)
Lina Sotis (columnist)
Gian Antonio Stella (Journalist)
Danilo Taino (Journalist)
Paolo Valentino (Berlin correspondent)
Chiara Vanzetto (journalist)
Franco Venturini (Columnist)
Francesco Verderami (Journalist)

Supplements 

 L'Economia (on Monday);
 Buone Notizie (on Tuesday);
 ViviMilano (on Wednesday, only in the Province of Milan);
 Sette (on Thursday);
 Liberi Tutti (on Friday);
 IO Donna (on Saturday);
 La Lettura (on Sunday);
 Corriere della Sera Style (monthly);
 Corriere Innovazione (monthly).

Local editions 

 Corriere della Sera Brescia (in the Province of Brescia);
 Corriere della Sera Bergamo (in the Province of Bergamo);
 Corriere della Sera Milano (in the Province of Milan);
 Corriere della Sera Roma (in the Province of Rome);
 Corriere della Sera Torino (in the Province of Turin);
 Corriere di Verona (in the Province of Verona);
 Corriere del Veneto (in Veneto);
 Corriere del Trentino (in Trentino);
 Corriere dell'Alto Adige (in South Tyrol);
 Corriere di Bologna (in the Province of Bologna);
 Corriere Fiorentino (in Tuscany);
 Corriere del Mezzogiorno (in Apulia, Campania and Basilicata).

See also

 Corriere dei Piccoli, originally a children's supplement of the Corriere della Sera.
List of non-English-language newspapers with English-language subsections
 Mass media in Italy
 Propaganda and censorship in Italy during the First World War

References

Further reading
 Merrill, John C. and Harold A. Fisher (1980). The world's great dailies: profiles of fifty newspapers. pp. 104–110.

External links

 
 

1876 establishments in Italy
Conservatism in Italy
Italian-language newspapers
Liberal media
Newspapers published in Milan
Publications established in 1876
RCS MediaGroup newspapers
Daily newspapers published in Italy
Italian news websites